Thielaviopsis ceramica is a plant-pathogenic saprobic fungal species first found in Africa, infecting Acacia mearnsii and Eucalyptus species.

References

Further reading
Chen, ShuaiFei, et al. "Taxonomy and pathogenicity of Ceratocystis species on Eucalyptus trees in South China, including C. chinaeucensis sp. nov." Fungal Diversity 58.1 (2013): 267–279.
Van Wyk, Marelize, Brenda D. Wingfield, and Michael J. Wingfield. "Four new Ceratocystis spp. associated with wounds on Eucalyptus, Schizolobium and Terminalia trees in Ecuador." Fungal Diversity 46.1 (2011): 111–131.
Roux, J., and M. J. Wingfield. "Ceratocystis species: emerging pathogens of non-native plantation Eucalyptus and Acacia species." Southern Forests: a Journal of Forest Science 71.2 (2009): 115–120.

External links
 MycoBank

Fungal plant pathogens and diseases
Microascales
Fungi described in 2009